Sameera Gunaratne (born 12 February 1996) is a Sri Lankan cricketer. He made his List A debut on 15 December 2019, for Nugegoda Sports and Welfare Club in the 2019–20 Invitation Limited Over Tournament. He made his first-class debut on 14 February 2020, for Nugegoda Sports and Welfare Club in Tier B of the 2019–20 Premier League Tournament.

References

External links
 

cricketers]]

1996 births
Living people
Nugegoda Sports and Welfare Club cricketers 
Sri Lankan cricketers
Place of birth missing (living people)